Lactarius albolutescens is a member of the large genus Lactarius (order Russulales), known as milk-caps. Found in North America, the species was first described in 1957 by American mycologist Harry D. Thiers.

See also
 List of Lactarius species

References

albolutescens
Fungi of North America
Fungi described in 1957